Liu Yuchen (born 3 January 1989) is a Chinese footballer currently playing as a left-back for Dalian Duxing.

Career statistics

Club
.

Notes

References

1989 births
Living people
Chinese footballers
Association football defenders
China League Two players
China League One players
Guangdong Sunray Cave F.C. players
Dalian Transcendence F.C. players
Shaoxing Keqiao Yuejia F.C. players
Jiangxi Beidamen F.C. players